Mateja Njamculović (born 2 October 2001) is a Serbian footballer who plays as a midfielder for IMT.

Club career
Passing through the youth categories of FK Zemun, Njamculović has been promoted to the first in summer 2018. He made his debut for the club in the opening match of the 2018–19 Serbian SuperLiga campaign, against Čukarički. He joined the game replacing Aleksa Marković in 81 minute, and had been sent off in the additional time, pairing yellow cards.

Career statistics

Club

References

External links
 
 

2001 births
Living people
Association football midfielders
Serbian footballers
FK Zemun players
FK IMT players
Serbian SuperLiga players
Serbian First League players